
T-cell acute lymphocytic leukemia protein 1 (i.e. TAL1 but also termed stem cell leukemia/T-cell acute leukemia 1 [i.e. SCL/TAL1]) is a protein that in humans is encoded by the TAL1 gene.

The protein encoded by TAL1 is a basic helix-loop-helix transcription factor.

Interactions 

TAL1 has been shown to interact with:

 CBFA2T3, 
 EP300, 
 GATA1,
 LDB1, 
 LMO1, 
 LMO2, 
 SIN3A, 
 Sp1 transcription factor,  and
 TCF3.

References

Further reading

External links 
 
 

Transcription factors